Killough is a village and townland in County Down, Northern Ireland. It lies on the Irish Sea shore near Ardglass, five miles southeast of Downpatrick. It is a conservation area notable for its sycamore-lined main street. In the 2001 Census it had a population of 845 people.

History
The townland of Killough appears in the Down Survey as Kiltaghlins. The owner in 1641 was given as Thomas Cromwell Viscount of Lecale, a direct descendent of Thomas Cromwell chief minister to Henry VIII.

The harbour was built in the 18th century by the Wards of Castle Ward house, just outside Strangford. Michael Ward had the  straight road from Castle Ward to Killough built in 1740.  Ward called the village Port St Anne but that name did not stick. The name St Anne's Port was also used.

After the outbreak of war between Great Britain and France in 1793 the growing of cereals increased in Lecale and Killough, as one of the ports of export, expanded to deal with it, until its population was almost double what it is today.

A report in 1822 comments on the considerable corn and coal trade and the 22 yawls which "afford the chief supply of white fish to the county of Down."

The existing harbour facilities were soon inadequate and between 1821 and 1824, Michael Ward's son, the first Lord Bangor, employed the engineer Alexander Nimmo, to build new quays at a cost of £17,000. The village prospered and the grain merchants built their imposing houses in Castle Street, and their stores on the narrow lane leading to the quays.

The distinctive Sycamore avenue along Castle Street was planted in 1850.

The Troubles
In September 1981 an off-duty police officer, Sandy Stewart, was shot dead by the IRA in the Ann Boal Inn. He was engaged to the pub's owner, Ann Boal. She died a few years later.

Demography
Killough is classified as a small village or hamlet by the Northern Ireland Statistics and Research Agency (NISRA). That is with a population between 500 and 1,000. On Census day (29 April 2001) there were 845 people living in Killough. Of these:
28.5% were aged under 16 years and 13.3% were aged 60 and over
48.3% of the population were male and 51.7% were female
91.8% were from a Catholic background and 6.8% were from a Protestant background
7.3% of people aged 16–74 were unemployed

Historical Populations
Pender's Census of Ireland in the 1650s recorded only 21 people in Killough. The Parliamentary Gazetteer of 1846 gave it as 1148 people.

Places of interest
St John's Point lighthouse and ancient church are close to Killough.

Alms houses on the Rossglass Road were endowed by local philanthropist Charles Sheils, designed by Charles Lanyon

Education
St. Joseph's Primary School is located on Main Street.

Killough Playgroup is located on Main Street.

Cultural references

Killough was used as one of 133 filming locations for the 2008 Kari Skogland film Fifty Dead Men Walking.

Killough was used as the main Irish filming location for The Shore, an Academy Award winning short film about a man who emigrated to America to escape the Troubles bringing his daughter back to Northern Ireland to meet his childhood friends. The 30-minute film was shot entirely on location in Killough.

Scenes from Terry George's 2011 film Whole Lotta Sole starring Brendan Fraser and Martin McCann were shot on location in the village, using Killough's harbour and beaches for many of the exterior shots.

The village is the inspiration for the memoir Sweet Killough, Let Go Your Anchor by Irish politician Maurice Hayes, taken from the publication of the same name.

Notable people
Paul George, footballer
Jim Manley, artist
Charles William Russell (1812–1880), priest and scholar.
Henry Russell (1834–1909), explorer.

Gallery

References

External links
Lewis' Topographical Dictionary – Killough
St John's Point Church

Villages in County Down
Townlands of County Down
Civil parish of Rathmullan, County Down